A material consideration, in the United Kingdom, is a process in planning law in which the decision maker when assessing an application for development must consider in deciding the outcome of an application.

Material considerations in the past have included issues regarding traffic, wildlife, economic impacts and the historical interest of the area. In considering an application for development, decision makers often consult local development plans and the National Planning Policy Framework (NPPF) to determine the success of a proposal.

Issues such as loss of a view, or effect on property values are not material considerations.

The Campaign to Protect Rural England advises that Material Considerations are factors that will be taken into account when a decision on a planning application or appeal is reached. Under Section 38 of the Planning and Compulsory Purchase Act 2004, decisions on planning applications 'must be made in accordance with the [development] plan unless other material considerations indicate otherwise'.

The courts ultimately decide what a material consideration is. However, case law gives local planning authorities a great deal of leeway to decide what considerations are relevant and how much weight should be given to them, each time they make a decision on a planning application. Any consideration that relates to the use or development of land is capable of being a material consideration, but other circumstances such as personal hardship and fears of affected residents can be considered in exceptional cases (the House of Lords in Great Portland Estates v. Westminster City Council [1985]).

In practice, government planning policy is often the most important material consideration other than the development plan. Government policy may also override the development plan if it has been both consulted on and published more recently.

Local government in the United Kingdom
United Kingdom planning law
Public policy in England